Dr.  Curtis Gordon Hames Sr. (19 Feb 1920 Claxton, Georgia - January 6, 2005 Savannah, Georgia) was a family physician and pioneer in the epidemiologic study of heart disease and stroke.  

He graduated from the Medical College of Georgia in 1944. 
He was a visiting clinical professor in the Medical University of South Carolina Department of Family Medicine.  From 1958 to 1995, the National Institutes of Health funded his Evans County Heart Study, which resulted in more than 560 published papers.  The study showed the value of HDL cholesterol.

Honors
Medical College of Georgia established the Curtis G. Hames Chair in Family Medicine; Georgia Southern University established Curtis G. Hames Scholarships in Nursing; Society of Teachers of Family Medicine established the Curtis G. Hames Research Award.

Awards
 1984 MacArthur Fellows Program  
 Lamartine Griffin Hardman Cup Award by the Medical Association of Georgia
 Albert Lasker Special Public Health Award

References

External links
Curtis G. Haines", google scholar
 

1920 births
2005 deaths
Georgia Health Sciences University
Medical University of South Carolina faculty
MacArthur Fellows
People from Claxton, Georgia
American physicians
Members of the National Academy of Medicine